Movement for Reform Judaism, the larger and relatively moderate of the two World Union for Progressive Judaism-affiliates in Britain
 Liberal Judaism (United Kingdom), the smaller and more radical